Felea is a Romanian surname. Notable people with the surname include:

Ilarion Felea (1903–1961), Romanian priest and theologian
Victor Felea (1923–1993), Romanian poet, essayist, and literary critic

Romanian-language surnames